Sanosara is a village located in India in the  Bhavnagar district. Its approximate population is 15,000 people. It is home to an agricultural college named Lokbharti.

References

Villages in Bhavnagar district